Midara is a genus of moths in the subfamily Arctiinae.

Species
 Midara balbalasanga Schaus, 1928
 Midara bengueta Schaus, 1928

References

Natural History Museum Lepidoptera generic names catalog

Arctiinae